The 1999 WNBA season was the Orlando Miracle's inaugural season. The Miracle tied for second place in the conference with the Detroit Shock and the Charlotte Sting. However, both Detroit and Charlotte beat Orlando in two of their three meetings during the regular season. Therefore, the Miracle were in fourth place and out of playoff contention.

Offseason

Expansion Draft

WNBA Draft

Roster

Season standings

Season schedule

Preseason

|-  style="text-align:center; background:#bfb;"
| 1 || June 4 || @ Minnesota || W 80-76 || N/A || N/A || N/A || Midwest Wireless Civic Center   || 1-0
|-  style="text-align:center; background:#bfb;"
| 2 || June 6 || Minnesota || W 81-71 || N/A || N/A || N/A || Amway Arena   || 2-0
|-

Regular season

|-  style="text-align:center; background:#fbb;"
| 1 || June 10 || Houston || L 63-77 || McWilliams (15) || McWilliams (7) || S. Johnson (7) || Amway Arena   || 0-1
|-  style="text-align:center; background:#fbb;"
| 2 || June 12 || @ Utah || L 65-71 || Sam (21) || Sam (10) || S. Johnson (7) || Delta Center   || 0-2
|-  style="text-align:center; background:#bfb;"
| 3 || June 15 || Los Angeles || W 88-86 || Sales (29) || Congreaves (10) || S. Johnson (8) || Amway Arena   || 1-2
|-  style="text-align:center; background:#fbb;"
| 4 || June 17 || @ Detroit || L 74-79 || S. Johnson (22) || McWilliams (13) || McWilliams, Sales (2) || Palace of Auburn Hills   || 1-3
|-  style="text-align:center; background:#bfb;"
| 5 || June 19 || Washington || W 73-68 || S. Johnson (18) || McWilliams (11) || S. Johnson (7) || Amway Arena   || 2-3
|-  style="text-align:center; background:#bfb;"
| 6 || June 21 || Phoenix || W 80-76 || Sam, Sales (20) || McWilliams (9) || S. Johnson (9) || Amway Arena   || 3-3
|-  style="text-align:center; background:#bfb;"
| 7 || June 22 || @ Cleveland || W 71-62 || Sam (22) || McWilliams, Sales (7) || Sales (6) || Gund Arena   || 4-3
|-  style="text-align:center; background:#bfb;"
| 8 || June 28 || @ Houston || W 68-66 || Sales (23) || Sam (6) || S. Johnson, Sales (4) || Compaq Center   || 5-3
|-

|-  style="text-align:center; background:#fbb;"
| 9 || July 3 || Charlotte || L 58-75 || S. Johnson (17) || McWilliams (11) || S. Johnson (4) || Amway Arena   || 5-4
|-  style="text-align:center; background:#fbb;"
| 10 || July 7 || Minnesota || L 66-71 || Sam (15) || McGhee, Sam (7) || S. Johnson (6) || Amway Arena   || 5-5
|-  style="text-align:center; background:#bfb;"
| 11 || July 9 || @ Charlotte || W 66-61 || Sales (16) || McWilliams, S. Johnson (5) || S. Johnson (4) || Charlotte Coliseum   || 6-5
|-  style="text-align:center; background:#bfb;"
| 12 || July 10 || Utah || W 62-56 || Sales (21) || S. Johnson (8) || S. Johnson (4) || Amway Arena   || 7-5
|-  style="text-align:center; background:#fbb;"
| 13 || July 12 || Detroit || L 67-76 || McWilliams, Congreaves (14) || McWilliams (8) || S. Johnson, Sam (5) || Amway Arena   || 7-6
|-  style="text-align:center; background:#fbb;"
| 14 || July 16 || Charlotte || L 50-56 || Sales (15) || McWilliams (6) || S. Johnson (3) || Amway Arena   || 7-7
|-  style="text-align:center; background:#fbb;"
| 15 || July 17 || Sacramento || L 70-76 || Sales (20) || McWilliams (10) || S. Johnson (9) || Amway Arena   || 7-8
|-  style="text-align:center; background:#bfb;"
| 16 || July 19 || @ Washington || W 77-52 || Sam (20) || S. Johnson (6) || S. Johnson, Sales (6) || MCI Center   || 8-8
|-  style="text-align:center; background:#fbb;"
| 17 || July 20 || @ New York || L 56-61 || McWilliams (13) || S. Johnson (7) || Sam (3) || Madison Square Garden   || 8-9
|-  style="text-align:center; background:#fbb;"
| 18 || July 23 || @ Phoenix || L 67-73 || S. Johnson (22) || Sam (6) || S. Johnson (6) || America West Arena   || 8-10
|-  style="text-align:center; background:#bfb;"
| 19 || July 24 || @ Sacramento || W 73-64 || S. Johnson (31) || McWilliams (10) || S. Johnson (5) || ARCO Arena   || 9-10
|-  style="text-align:center; background:#fbb;"
| 20 || July 27 || @ Los Angeles || L 60-81 || McWilliams (17) || McWilliams (7) || Powell (4) || Staples Center   || 9-11
|-  style="text-align:center; background:#fbb;"
| 21 || July 29 || New York || L 65-73 (OT) || S. Johnson (25) || McWilliams (12) || S. Johnson (5) || Amway Arena   || 9-12
|-

|-  style="text-align:center; background:#fbb;"
| 22 || August 1 || @ New York || L 61-74 || Sales (21) || Sales (8) || S. Johnson, Congreaves (3) || Madison Square Garden   || 9-13
|-  style="text-align:center; background:#bfb;"
| 23 || August 4 || Cleveland || W 70-62 || McWilliams (16) || McWilliams (9) || S. Johnson (5) || Amway Arena   || 10-13
|-  style="text-align:center; background:#fbb;"
| 24 || August 5 || @ Washington || L 68-72 || McWilliams (24) || McWilliams (10) || Sam (7) || MCI Center   || 10-14
|-  style="text-align:center; background:#fbb;"
| 25 || August 7 || @ Charlotte || L 60-64 || S. Johnson (25) || McWilliams (6) || Sales (5) || Charlotte Coliseum   || 10-15
|-  style="text-align:center; background:#fbb;"
| 26 || August 9 || New York || L 75-80 || Sales (24) || McWilliams, Sales (6) || Sales (5) || Amway Arena   || 10-16
|-  style="text-align:center; background:#bfb;"
| 27 || August 12 || Cleveland || W 55-54 || Sales (16) || McWilliams (15) || Sales (5) || Amway Arena   || 11-16
|-  style="text-align:center; background:#bfb;"
| 28 || August 14 || @ Cleveland || W 73-61 || Sales (17) || S. Johnson (6) || S. Johnson (8) || Amway Arena   || 12-16
|-  style="text-align:center; background:#bfb;"
| 29 || August 15 || Washington || W 81-54 || Sam (19) || McWilliams (9) || Sales (6) || Amway Arena   || 13-16
|-  style="text-align:center; background:#bfb;"
| 30 || August 18 || Detroit || W 93-81 || McWilliams (21) || McWilliams (13) || Powell (6) || Amway Arena   || 14-16
|-  style="text-align:center; background:#bfb;"
| 31 || August 20 || @ Minnesota || W 83-80 (OT) || S. Johnson (20) || McWilliams (8) || S. Johnson, Sales, Powell (5) || Target Center   || 15-16
|-  style="text-align:center; background:#fbb;"
| 32 || August 21 || @ Detroit || L 68-74 || S. Johnson (22) || Sam (7) || Powell (4) || Palace of Auburn Hills   || 15-17
|-

Depth

Player stats

Shannon Johnson was tied for tenth in the WNBA in Three Point Field Goals with 40
Taj McWilliams-Franklin ranked third in the WNBA in Three Point Field Goal Percentage, .444
Nykesha Sales ranked eighth in the WNBA in Field Goal Attempts with 397
Sheri Sam ranked sixth in the WNBA in Minutes Played with 1088
Sheri Sam was tied for eighth in the WNBA in Three Point Field Goals with 41
Sheri Sam ranked ninth in the WNBA in Three Point Field Goal Attempts with 125

Awards and honors
Shannon Johnson, Guard, Orlando Miracle, All-WNBA Second Team
Shannon Johnson led the WNBA in Minutes Played with 1147

References

Orlando Miracle seasons
Orlando
Orlando Miracle